Pear is a moribund Austroasiatic language of Cambodia. "Pear" (French Péâr) is a pejorative term for the historical slave caste of the Khmer, but nonetheless is the usual term in the literature. Pear is spoken in 3–4 villages of Rovieng District, Preah Vihear Province, Cambodia according to Ethnologue.

Sidwell (2009), citing Baradat (ms), considers Pear of Kompong Thom to be the most divergent Pearic language.

References

Pearic languages
Endangered Austroasiatic languages